The 1970 Embassy British Indoor Championships – Men's singles was an event of the 1970 Embassy British Indoor Championships tennis tournament and was played on indoor carpet courts at the Wembley Arena in London in the United Kingdom between 16 November and 21 November 1970. The draw comprised 32 players of whom eight were seeded. Rod Laver was the reigning singles champion at the British Indoor Championships. First-seeded Laver retained his title by defeating third-seeded  Cliff Richey in the final, 6–3, 6–4, 6–4.

Seeds

Draw

Finals

Top half

Bottom half

References

External links
 ITF tournament edition details

Wembley Championships
1970 Grand Prix (tennis)